The 2012 edition of Campeonato Paraibano's First Division was contested by 10 clubs and started on February 5, 2012. Treze were the defending champions, having won the tournament in 2011, but they were eliminated in the second stage by Sousa.

Campinense won their eighteenth league title, the first since 2008.

Format
The format was the same used in 2011. The tournament is played in two stages: the first one is a standard round-robin format in which all teams play each other in home and away fixtures. Each win is awarded with 3 points, and each draw grants 1 point to both clubs involved in the match. The 2 worst-placed clubs of this stage will be relegated to 2013 Campeonato Paraibano Second Division. The second stage will be played in a two-legged knockout format, where the 4 best-placed teams from the first stage will compete.

If the champion from both stages ends up being the same team, it will be declared the 2012 Campeonato Paraibano champion. Otherwise, the winners from the two stages will play a new two-legged knockout to decide the champion. In any of the knockout stages, the clubs with the best records in the first stage are higher seeded, advancing in case of a draw.

Team information

First stage

Standings
The 2012 Campeonato Paraibano first stage began on February 5 and ended on April 22.

Results

Second stage
The second stage started on April 25 and ended on May 6.

Semifinals
First legs were played on 25 April 2012. Return legs were played on 28 and 29 April 2012.

Finals
Matches were played on 2 and 6 May 2012.

Grand Finals
As the two stages didn't have the same winner, Campinense (first stage champion) and Sousa (second stage champion) played another two-legged play-off to decide the Campeonato Paraibano.

The matches were played on 9 and 13 May 2012. The aggregate 5-1 result gave Campinense their 18th title.

References

2012
Paraibano